Stefano Fabri junior (born c. 1606 in Rome; died 27 August 1658 in Rome) was the son of Stefano Fab(b)ri (1560–1609), who was the Kapellmeister of the Cappella Giulia. He was the pupil of Giovanni Bernardino Nanino. He was the music teacher of Francesco Beretta.

Biography 
He was the director of music at the Seminario Romano (1638-1639) and following until 1644 at S. Giovanni dei Fiorentini. Afterwards he stayed at S. Luigi de’ Francesi until 1657. He is claimed to have been the director of music of the ensemble of the church of Santa Maria Maggiore in 1648 - definitely he is mentioned there beginning in 1657. He is also supposed to have been offered employment as a director of music for St. Peter in Rome in 1654, but Baini reports Orazio Benevoli to have been the Maestro there at that time.

A compilation of several compositions (Florido, Cantiones Sacrae ab Excell. Musices Auctoribus) notices him as Maestro in S. Pietro in Vaticano.
A severe outbreak of pestilence in 1656 made Pope Alexander VII forbid all public events in Rome. Despite all that Fabri was made the maestro at Santa Maria Maggiore and in 1657 he advanced to be the director of music of the private chapel of the Borghese family at the same church.

Works 
About twenty of his compositions had been published during his lifetime. Several compilations of all the composers of that time were edited by Domenico Bianchi, Filippo Beretti, Giovanni Poggioli and especially by Florido de Silvestris. His brother-in-law and Giacomo Fei published his Magnificat and the Salmi concertati. Many  polychoral compositions have been preserved, for example pieces of music like the Magnificat, Confitebor, Laudate pueri, etc.. In Santa Maria Maggiore exists a copy of a mass in five parts.

 Motets a 2-5, Rome 1650
 Salmi concertanti, 1660

Sheet music 
 Fabri, Credidi propter quod locutus sum: https://musopen.org/de/music/39022-credidi-propter-quod-locutus-sum/
 Fabri, Emendemus in melius (3 voices, B. continuo): https://musopen.org/de/music/39023-emendemus-in-melius/

Recordings 
 Choral Concert: Uppsala Academic Chamber Choir - FABRI II, S. / BERNHARD, C. / VESI, S. / PERANDA, G. / SCHMELZER, J.H. (Laudate!); Catalogue: Proprius PROP7800; Naxos
 Choral Concert: Uppsala Academic Chamber Choir - FABRI II, S. / BERNHARD, C. / VESI, S. / PERANDA, G. / SCHMELZER, J.H. / FOGGIA, F. (Laudate); Catalogue: Proprius PRCD9100; Naxos

Further reading 
Grove, George; Dictionary of Music and Musicians; London: Macmillan and Co.

References

External links 
 https://www.treccani.it/enciclopedia/stefano-fabbri/, about Stefano Fabri senior 
 https://www.treccani.it/enciclopedia/stefano-iunior-fabri_(Dizionario-Biografico)

1600s births
1658 deaths
Year of birth uncertain
Musicians from Rome
Italian male classical composers
Italian Baroque composers
Sacred music composers
17th-century Italian composers
17th-century male musicians